Grigoriy Osipovich Vinokur (17 November, 1896, Warsaw – 17 May 1947, Moscow) was a Russian linguist and literary historian. He was educated in Moscow. After a brief spell as an interpreter in Estonia and Latvia he returned there, remaining for the rest of his life.

References

1896 births
1947 deaths